Basia is a small village in Chach Valley of Attock District in Punjab Province of Pakistan. It is located between Peshawar and Islamabad, not far from Attock City.

References

Villages in Attock District